The CRA Super Series is a super late model stock car racing series owned and operated by the Champion Racing Association. It is a touring series based in the Midwestern United States, which competes at paved short ovals. It was formerly known as the Kendall Late Model Series and the Sunoco Super Series.

The series utilizes super late model chassis race cars. Regulations on engine and body are based on the United Super Late Model Rules Alliance using an Approved Body Configuration legal body, with 358 cubic inch engines. Car body designs are based on the Holden Commodore (VF) (2014-17), Chevrolet Camaro, Dodge Charger, Ford Fusion, and the Toyota Camry.

Most races are 100-125 laps long, except the Winchester 400 at Winchester Speedway, the Redbud 400 at Anderson Speedway, the Berlin 251 at Berlin Raceway, and the SpeedFest 200 at Watermelon Capital Speedway.

The CRA Super Series is based out of Indiana, but in the past few years has been expanding its series to visit a variety of racetracks from Michigan to Florida. CRA started a partnership with the ARCA Racing Series presented by Menards at the start of the 2012 season.  CRA also has a partnership with the Southern Super Series that races in Alabama, Tennessee, and Florida, and the CARS Tour in Virginia, the Carolinas, and Tennessee with a series of combination races for all three tours, including one at Bristol Motor Speedway.

The winningest driver in CRA Super Series history is Scott Hantz, with 31 career wins. He also shares the record with Johnny VanDoorn for the most series championships with 3 each. 

Two women have won a CRA Super Series race, with Kenzie Ruston (now NASCAR Xfinity Series driver Daniel Hemric's wife) winning at Lucas Oil Raceway in 2012 (the same year her future husband won the series championship) and Ali Kern at Kalamazoo Speedway in 2015.

Rookies of the Year 

2022 Billy Van Meter
2020 Jaren Crabtree
2019 Jake Dossey III
2018 Austin Kunert
2017 Logan Runyon
2016 Dalton Armstrong
2015 Grant Quinlan
2014 West Griffith, Jr.
2013 Ali Kern
2012 Travis Braden
2011 Derrick Griffin
2010 Nick Gullatta
2009 Tyler Roahrig
2008 Aaron Pierce
2007 Johnny Van Doorn
2006 Danny Jackson
2005 Tommy St. John
2004 Chris Gabehart
2003 Chuck Barnes, Jr.
2002 Andy Ponstein
2001 Joel Kauffman
2000 Scott Hantz
1999 Peter Cozzolino
1998 Spanks Overbeck

CRA Super Series Champions 

2022 Eddie Van Meter
2021 Hunter Jack
2020 Josh Brock
2019 Greg Van Alst
2018 Josh Brock
2017 Logan Runyon
2016 Cody Coughlin (first to claim CRA Super Series and CRA JEGS All Stars Tour championships in the same year)
2015 Grant Quinlan
2014 Travis Braden
2013 Travis Braden
2012 Johnny Van Doorn (1st year of ARCA's partnership with CRA)
2011 Derrick Griffin
2010 Johnny Van Doorn
2009 Johnny Van Doorn
2008 Scott Hantz
2007 Chris Gabehart
2006 Scott Hantz
2005 Jeff Lane
2004 Chuck Barnes, Jr.
2003 Bobby Parsley
2002 Joel Kauffman
2001 Brian Ross
2000 Scott Hantz (first to claim both Rookie of the Year and Series Championship)
1999 Brian Ross
1998 Brian Rievely
1997 Kenny Tweedy

Racetracks
The most frequent CRA racetracks have been:

The series has visited several other racetracks, including Bristol Motor Speedway and North Wilkesboro Speedway.

See also
 Winchester 400

External links
Champion Racing Association
CRA Super Series at The Third Turn

Stock car racing series in the United States
Automobile Racing Club of America